María Begoña Juaristi Mateo (born May 20, 1968 in Maracaibo, Venezuela) competed as Miss Zulia in her country's national beauty pageant Miss Venezuela, obtaining the title of Miss World Venezuela.

As the official representative of her country to the Miss World pageant held in London, United Kingdom on November 13, 1986, she became 4th runner-up to eventual winner Giselle Laronde of Trinidad and Tobago.

References

External links
Miss Venezuela Official Website
Miss World Official Website

1968 births
Living people
People from Maracaibo
Miss Venezuela World winners
Miss World 1986 delegates